Antony John Blinken (born April 16, 1962) is an American government official and diplomat serving since January 26, 2021 as the 71st United States secretary of state. He previously served as deputy national security advisor from 2013 to 2015 and deputy secretary of state from 2015 to 2017 under President Barack Obama.

During the Clinton administration, Blinken served in the State Department and in senior positions on the National Security Council from 1994 to 2001. He was a senior fellow at the Center for Strategic and International Studies from 2001 to 2002. He advocated for the 2003 invasion of Iraq while serving as the Democratic staff director of the Senate Foreign Relations Committee from 2002 to 2008. He was a foreign policy advisor for Joe Biden's 2008 presidential campaign, before advising the Obama–Biden presidential transition.

From 2009 to 2013, Blinken served as deputy assistant to the president and national security advisor to the vice president. During his tenure in the Obama administration, he helped craft U.S. policy on Afghanistan, Pakistan, and the nuclear program of Iran. After leaving government service, Blinken moved into the private sector, co-founding WestExec Advisors, a consulting firm. Blinken returned to government first as a foreign policy advisor for Biden's 2020 presidential campaign, then as Biden's pick for Secretary of State, a position the Senate confirmed him for on January 26, 2021.

Early life and education
Blinken was born on April 16, 1962, in Yonkers, New York, to Jewish parents, Judith (Frehm) and Donald M. Blinken, who later served as the U.S. ambassador to Hungary. His maternal grandparents were Hungarian Jews. Blinken's uncle, Alan Blinken, served as the U.S. ambassador to Belgium. His paternal grandfather, Maurice Henry Blinken, was an early backer of Israel who studied its economic viability, and his great-grandfather was Meir Blinken, a Yiddish writer.

Blinken attended Dalton School in New York City until 1971. He then moved to Paris with his mother Judith and Samuel Pisar, whom she married following her divorce from Blinken. In his confirmation hearing, Blinken told the story of his stepfather, who was the only Holocaust survivor of the 900 children of his school in Poland. Pisar found refuge in a U.S. tank after making a break into the forest during a Nazi death march. In Paris, Blinken attended École Jeannine Manuel.

Blinken attended Harvard University from 1980 to 1984, where he majored in social studies. He co-edited Harvard's daily student newspaper, The Harvard Crimson, and wrote a number of articles on current affairs. After graduating from Harvard, Blinken worked as an intern for The New Republic for about a year. He earned a J.D. from Columbia Law School in 1988 and practiced law in New York City and Paris. Blinken worked with his father to raise funds for Michael Dukakis, the Democratic nominee in the 1988 United States presidential election.

In his monograph Ally versus Ally: America, Europe, and the Siberian Pipeline Crisis (1987), Blinken argued that exerting diplomatic pressure on the Soviet Union during the Siberian pipeline crisis was less significant for American interests than maintaining strong relations between the United States and Europe. Ally versus Ally was based on Blinken's undergraduate thesis.

Early career

Clinton and Bush administrations
Blinken has held senior foreign policy positions in two administrations over two decades. He was a member of the National Security Council (NSC) staff from 1994 to 2001. From 1994 to 1998, Blinken was Special Assistant to the President and Senior Director for Strategic Planning and NSC Senior Director for Speechwriting. From 1999 to 2001, he was Special Assistant to the President and Senior Director for European and Canadian Affairs.

Blinken supported the U.S.-led invasion of Iraq in 2003. In 2002, he was appointed staff director for the Senate Foreign Relations Committee, a position he served in until 2008. Blinken assisted then-Senator Joe Biden, Chair of the Senate Foreign Relations Committee, in formulating Biden's support for the U.S. invasion of Iraq, with Blinken characterizing the vote to invade Iraq as "a vote for tough diplomacy".

In the years following the U.S. invasion and occupation of Iraq, Blinken assisted Biden in formulating a proposal in the Senate to establish in Iraq three independent regions divided along ethnic or sectarian lines: a "Shiastan" in the south, a "Sunnistan" in the north, as well as Iraqi Kurdistan. The proposal was overwhelmingly rejected at home, as well as in Iraq, where the prime minister opposed the partition plan.

He was also a senior fellow at the Center for Strategic and International Studies. In 2008, Blinken worked for Joe Biden's presidential campaign, and was a member of the Obama–Biden presidential transition team.

Obama administration

From 2009 to 2013, Blinken was Deputy Assistant to the President and National Security Advisor to the Vice President. In this position he helped craft U.S. policy on Afghanistan, Pakistan, and the nuclear program of Iran. Blinken was sworn in as Deputy National Security Advisor, succeeding Denis McDonough, on January 20, 2013.

On November 7, 2014, President Obama announced that he would nominate Blinken for the deputy secretary post, replacing the retiring William J. Burns. On December 16, 2014, Blinken was confirmed as Deputy Secretary of State by the Senate by a vote of 55 to 38.

Of Obama's 2011 decision to kill Osama bin Laden, Blinken said "I've never seen a more courageous decision made by a leader." A 2013 profile described him as "one of the government's key players in drafting Syria policy", for which he served as a public face. Blinken was influential in formulating the Obama administration's response to the annexation of Crimea by the Russian Federation in the aftermath of the 2014 Ukrainian revolution.

Blinken supported the 2011 military intervention in Libya and the supply of weapons to Syrian rebels. He condemned the 2016 Turkish coup d'état attempt and expressed support for the democratically elected Turkish government and its institutions, but also criticized the 2016–present purges in Turkey. In April 2015, Blinken voiced support for the Saudi Arabian–led intervention in Yemen. He said that "as part of that effort, we have expedited weapons deliveries, we have increased our intelligence sharing, and we have established a joint coordination planning cell in the Saudi operation centre."

Blinken worked with Biden on requests for American money to replenish Israel's arsenal of Iron Dome interceptor missiles during the 2014 Israel–Gaza conflict. In May 2015, Blinken criticized the persecution of Muslims in Myanmar and warned Myanmar's leaders about the dangers of anti-Muslim legislation, saying that Rohingya Muslims "should have a path to citizenship. The uncertainty that comes from not having any status is one of the things that may drive people to leave."

In June 2015, Blinken claimed that more than ten thousand ISIL fighters had been killed by American-led airstrikes against the Islamic State since a U.S.-led coalition launched a campaign against it nine months ago.

Private sector

WestExec Advisors
In 2017, Blinken co-founded WestExec Advisors, a political strategy advising firm, with Michèle Flournoy, Sergio Aguirre, and Nitin Chadda. WestExec's clients have included Google's Jigsaw, Israeli artificial-intelligence company Windward, surveillance drone manufacturer Shield AI, which signed a $7.2million contract with the Air Force, and "Fortune 100 types". According to Foreign Policy, the firm's clientele includes "the defense industry, private equity firms, and hedge funds". Blinken received almost $1.2million in compensation from WestExec.

In an interview with The Intercept, Flournoy described WestExec's role as facilitating relationships between Silicon Valley firms and the Department of Defense and law enforcement; Flournoy and others compared WestExec to Kissinger Associates.

Pine Island Capital Partners
Blinken, as well as other Biden transition team members Michele Flournoy, former Pentagon advisor, and Lloyd Austin, Secretary of Defense, are partners of private equity firm Pine Island Capital Partners, a strategic partner of WestExec. Pine Island's chairman is John Thain, the final chairman of Merrill Lynch before its sale to Bank of America. Blinken went on leave from Pine Island in August 2020 to join the Biden campaign as a senior foreign policy advisor. He said he would divest himself of his equity stake in Pine Island if confirmed for a position in the Biden administration.

During the final stretch of Biden's presidential campaign, Pine Island raised $218million for a special-purpose acquisition company (SPAC), a public offering to invest in "defense, government service and aerospace industries" and COVID-19 relief, which the firm's prospectus (initially filed with the U.S. SEC in September and finalized on November 13, 2020) predicted would be profitable as the government looked to private contractors to address the pandemic. Thain said he chose the other partners because of their "access, network and expertise".

In a December 2020 New York Times article raising questions about potential conflicts of interest between WestExec principals, Pine Island advisors, including Blinken, and service in the Biden administration, critics called for full disclosure of all WestExec/Pine Island financial relationships, divestiture of ownership stakes in companies bidding on government contracts or enjoying existing contracts, and assurances that Blinken and others recuse themselves from decisions that might advantage their previous clients.

Blinken is a member of the Council on Foreign Relations and was previously a global affairs analyst for CNN.

Secretary of State

Nomination and confirmation

Blinken was a foreign policy advisor for Biden's 2020 presidential campaign.
On November 22, 2020, Bloomberg News reported that Biden had selected Blinken as his nominee for secretary of state. These reports were later corroborated by The New York Times and other outlets. On November 24, upon being announced as Biden's choice for secretary of state, Blinken said, "We can't solve all the world's problems alone [and] we need to be working with other countries." He had earlier remarked in a September 2020 interview with the Associated Press that "democracy is in retreat around the world, and unfortunately it's also in retreat at home because of the president taking a two-by-four to its institutions, its values and its people every day."

Blinken's confirmation hearing before the Senate Foreign Relations Committee began on January 19, 2021. His nomination was confirmed by the committee on January 25 with a vote of 15–3. On January 26, Blinken was confirmed in the full Senate by a vote of 78–22. Blinken took the oath of office of the secretary of state later that day. In doing so, he became the third former deputy secretary of state to serve as the Secretary of State, after Lawrence Eagleburger and Warren Christopher in 1992 and 1993, respectively.

Tenure

Myanmar 
On January 31, 2021, Blinken condemned the 2021 Myanmar coup d'état and expressed grave concerns on the detention of government officials and civil society leaders, calling for their immediate release. He stated that, "the United States will continue to take firm action against those who perpetrate violence against the people of Burma as they demand the restoration of their democratically elected government."

Afghanistan 
In February 2021, having spoken to president Ashraf Ghani, Blinken voiced support for Afghan peace negotiations with Taliban Islamist rebels and reiterated the United States' commitment to a peace deal that includes a "just and durable political settlement and permanent and comprehensive ceasefire." 

Blinken made an unannounced visit to Kabul on April 15 and met with U.S. military and diplomatic personnel following the Biden administration's announcement of the 2021 withdrawal of U.S. troops from Afghanistan. He said the decision to withdraw from Afghanistan was made to focus resources on China and the COVID-19 pandemic. He faced calls to resign as secretary of state following the US withdrawal from Afghanistan.

In August 2021, Blinken rejected comparisons between the deteriorating situation in Afghanistan due to the Taliban offensive, which started in May 2021 after U.S. and coalition military forces began withdrawing from Afghanistan, and the chaotic American departure from Saigon in 1975, saying that "We went to Afghanistan 20 years ago with one mission, and that mission was to deal with the folks who attacked us on 9/11 and we have succeeded in that mission."

Africa 

In February 2021, Blinken condemned ethnic cleansing in the Tigray region of northern Ethiopia and called for the immediate withdrawal of Eritrean forces and other fighters.

In the midst of the Biden administration's continuing review of the normalization agreement between Morocco and Israel enacted during the previous administration, Blinken maintained that the recognition of Morocco's sovereignty over the disputed territory of Western Sahara, which was annexed by Morocco in 1975, will not be reversed imminently. During internal discussions, he supported improving relations between the two countries and expressed urgency in appointing a United Nations envoy to Western Sahara.

South America 
Blinken spoke with the interim president of Venezuela, Juan Guaidó, whom the Biden administration will continue to recognize as the country's head of state and not Nicolás Maduro.

Asia 

Blinken made his first international trip with Secretary of Defense Lloyd Austin to Tokyo and Seoul on March 15, during which he warned China against coercion and aggression. He also condemned the Chinese government for committing genocide against ethnic Uyghurs.

In July 2021, the Biden administration accused China of a global cyberespionage campaign, which Blinken said posed "a major threat to our economic and national security".

In late April 2021, Blinken denounced the sentencing of Hong Kong pro-democracy activists Jimmy Lai, Albert Ho, and Lee Cheuk-yan among others, for their roles in the 2019 Hong Kong protests, calling it a "politically-motivated" decision.

In May 2022, Blinken stated that "China is the one country that has the intention as well as the economic, technological, military and diplomatic means to advance a different vision of international order." He dismissed China's claims to be neutral in the Russo-Ukrainian War and accused China of supporting Russia.

G7 meeting 

In May 2021, Blinken traveled to London and Reykjavík for the G7 Foreign and Development Ministers' meeting and the Arctic Council Ministerial meeting respectively. In a meeting with president Volodymyr Zelensky and foreign minister Dmytro Kuleba in Kyiv, Blinken reaffirmed support for Ukraine's sovereignty and territorial integrity against "Russian aggression". During the ongoing Israeli-Palestinian conflict, Blinken expressed support for Israel's right to defend itself but warned that evicting Palestinian families from their homes in East Jerusalem is among the actions that could further escalate outbreaks of violence and retaliation. He, along with the United Nations Security Council, called for full adherence to the truce and stressed the immediate need for humanitarian aid for Palestinian civilians while reiterating the need for a two-state solution. Following the ceasefire and coinciding Blinken's visit to Jerusalem on May 25, the transfer of food and medical supplies furnished by the United Nations and Physicians for Human Rights, aid workers, and journalists were permitted into the Gaza Strip.

Europe 

The decision to waive sanctions against Nord Stream AG and its chief executive Matthias Warnig, subsequent to the completion of the Nord Stream 2 natural gas pipeline, drew congressional criticisms. Blinken defended the action as pragmatic and practical to U.S. interests and remarked that proceeding otherwise would be counterproductive with European relations. In June 2021, Blinken traveled with Biden to attend the 47th G7 summit in Cornwall, the 31st NATO summit in Brussels, and the summit meeting with president Vladimir Putin in Geneva. Blinken and Biden both acknowledged that relations between the U.S. and Russia were at their lowest point, and a more predictable relationship remained a key priority. However, he signaled that further punitive actions would be enforced if the Russian government chose to continue with hostile activities such as interference in the 2020 presidential elections, the SolarWinds cyberattack, or the apparent poisoning and imprisonment of Alexei Navalny. Of the administration's decision to forgo a joint press conference after the summit, Blinken explained that it was "the most effective way" and "not a rare practice".

Later that month, Blinken traveled to Brussels for a NATO Ministerial with European Union counterparts to underscore the Biden administration's determination to strengthen transatlantic alliances.

Blinken has been a co-chair of the Trade and Technology Council since its creation in 2021 to encourage trade relation with the European Union.

Russia-Ukraine war 

In January 2022, Blinken authorized the supply of weapons to Ukraine to support the Eastern European country in amid border tensions with Russia. On February 11, Blinken publicly warned about the likelihood of a Russian invasion of Ukraine prior to the end the 2022 Winter Olympics. On February 13, Blinken said the risk of invasion was "high enough and the threat is imminent enough" that the evacuation of most staff from the U.S. Embassy in Kyiv was "the prudent thing to do". In September 2022, Blinken pledged that the United States would help the Ukrainian military retake Russian-occupied territories of Ukraine. He criticized Vladimir Putin's threats to use nuclear weapons, saying that "Russia has gotten itself into the mess that it’s in is because there is no one in the [autocratic] system to effectively tell Putin he’s doing the wrong thing."

Regarding the countries that decided to be neutral in the war between Russia and Ukraine, Blinken said that "It’s pretty hard to be neutral when it comes to this aggression. There is a clear aggressor. There is a clear victim."

Speaking about the 2022 Russian mobilization, he said that mobilized Russian civilians were being treated as "cannon fodder that Putin is trying to throw into the war." On October 21, 2022, Blinken said the United States saw no willingness on the side of Russia to end its war in Ukraine by diplomatic means, despite American attempts.

Americans detained abroad 
Blinken and the Biden administration have been criticized for the handling of Americans who are wrongfully imprisoned abroad. Families of U.S. detainees in the Middle East were upset that they were left off of a call with Secretary Blinken. In July 2022, Blinken had a meeting with Sergey Lavrov to discuss a prisoner swap to secure the release of Paul Whelan (security director) and Brittney Griner. Blinken has met with the Bring Our Families Home campaign, a coalition of families with loved ones detained abroad.

Blinken, along with the work of Special Presidential Envoy of Hostage Affairs Roger D. Carstens, has negotiated the release of over a dozen Americans wrongfully detained or held hostage abroad including Trevor Reed, Danny Fenster, Baquer Namazi, the entire Citgo Six, Osman Khan, Matthew John Heath, Mark Frerichs, and Jorge Alberto Fernández.

Foreign policy positions

As foreign policy advisor to then 2020 Democratic presidential nominee Joe Biden, The New York Times described Blinken as "ha[ving] Biden's ear on policy issues". Blinken has asserted that "[Biden] would not tie military assistance to Israel to things like annexation or other decisions by the Israeli government with which we might disagree". Blinken praised the Trump administration-brokered normalization agreements between Israel and Bahrain and the United Arab Emirates. On October 28, 2020, Blinken reaffirmed that a Biden administration will undertake strategic review of the relationship between the United States and Saudi Arabia, ensuring that it advances U.S interests and values. In January 2021, Blinken has stated the Biden administration would keep the American embassy to Israel in Jerusalem and would seek a two-state solution to the Israeli–Palestinian conflict.
Blinken is in favor of continuing non-nuclear sanctions against Iran and described it as "a strong hedge against Iranian misbehavior in other areas". He criticized former president Trump's withdrawal of the U.S. from the international nuclear agreement with Iran and expressed support for a "longer and stronger" nuclear deal. Blinken did not rule out a military intervention to stop Iran from obtaining nuclear weapons.

Blinken has been critical of the Trump administration in aiding China to advance its own key strategic goals. He stated: "[Trump] weaken[ed] American alliances, leaving a vacuum in the world for China to fill, abandoning our values and giving China a green light to trample on human rights and democracy from Xinjiang to Hong Kong". However, he also credited the former president's administration for its aggressive approach and has characterized China as a "techno-autocracy" which seeks world dominance. He indicated a desire to welcome political refugees from Hong Kong and stated that the Biden administration's commitment to Taiwan's defense would "absolutely endure", and that China's use of military force against Taiwan "would be a grievous mistake on their part". Blinken has also viewed China is committing genocide and crimes against humanity against Uyghur Muslims and other ethnic minorities in its northwestern region of Xinjiang. Blinken has characterized former president Trump's Phase One trade deal with China as "a debacle". He said it was unrealistic to "fully decouple" from China and has expressed support for "stronger economic ties with Taiwan".

Blinken has indicated American interest in robust ties between itself, Greece, Israel, and Cyprus regarding the Eastern Mediterranean Security and Energy Partnership Act and acknowledged the threats posed by an expansionist Turkey, which is "not acting like an ally". He opposed Turkish president Recep Erdogan's call for "a two-state solution in Cyprus", saying the Biden administration is committed to the reunification of Cyprus. Blinken has also suggested that he would consider sanctioning the Erdogan administration. Blinken reaffirmed his support of keeping NATO's door open for Georgia, a country in the Caucasus, and raised the argument that NATO member countries have been more effectively shielded from "Russian aggression".

Blinken expressed his support of extending the New Strategic Arms Reduction Treaty with Russia to limit the number of deployed strategic nuclear warheads. Blinken said the Biden administration will "review" security assistance to Azerbaijan due to the 2020 Nagorno-Karabakh war between Azerbaijan and Armenia over the disputed region of Nagorno-Karabakh and voiced his support for "the provision to Armenia of security assistance".

Blinken is opposed to the United Kingdom's separation from the European Union and has referred to it as a "total mess" with consequences adverse to U.S. interest. Blinken expressed concern over perceived human rights violations in Egypt under the presidency of Abdel Fattah el-Sisi. He condemned the arrest of three employees for the Egyptian Initiative for Personal Rights organization, saying that "meeting with foreign diplomats is not a crime. Nor is peacefully advocating for human rights." Referring to the re-instated Islamic Emirate of Afghanistan, declared by the Taliban following their 2021 capture of Kabul, Blinken has stated that the United States will not recognize any government that harbors terrorist groups or that does not uphold basic human rights.

Personal life
Blinken is Jewish. In 2002, Blinken and Evan Ryan were married in an interfaith ceremony officiated by a rabbi and a priest at Holy Trinity Catholic Church in Washington, D.C. They have two children. Blinken is fluent in French. He plays the guitar and has three songs available on Spotify by the alias Ablinken (pronounced "Abe Lincoln").

See also
Mike Pompeo foreign policy
John Kerry foreign policy
Hillary Clinton foreign policy

Publications

References

External links

Biography at the United States Department of State
Biography at the United States Department of State (2009–2017, archived)
Confirmation hearing for U.S. Secretary of State from the Senate Foreign Relations Committee (January 19, 2021)
 from WestExec Advisors

1962 births
Living people
People from Yonkers, New York
Blinken family
United States Deputy National Security Advisors
United States Deputy Secretaries of State
United States Secretaries of State
Obama administration personnel
Biden administration cabinet members
American people of Hungarian-Jewish descent
American people of Ukrainian-Jewish descent
Columbia Law School alumni
Dalton School alumni
Harvard College alumni
The Harvard Crimson people
Jewish American members of the Cabinet of the United States
New York (state) Democrats
20th-century American diplomats
21st-century American diplomats
21st-century American politicians
Biden administration personnel